Jámison Olave Mosquera (born April 21, 1981) is a Colombian former footballer who is currently the head coach of USL Championship side Real Monarchs.

Career
Olave began his career with  Deportivo Cali in 2001. He played on loan for a multitude of clubs in his native Colombia, before returning to his first club, Deportivo Cali in 2005. In his first season back with Cali, Olave helped the club capture the 2005 Finalización. While with Cali Olave appeared in 97 league matches and scored two goals.

In January 2008, Olave accepted an offer to join Real Salt Lake on a one-year loan deal with an option for the club to buy at the end of the season. On October 9, 2008, Olave scored RSL's first goal in their inaugural game at Rio Tinto Stadium, which helped his team draw 1-1 against New York Red Bulls, keeping the team's playoff hopes alive. On November 24, 2008 Olave agreed to a permanent contract with Real Salt Lake that would keep him through the 2012 season. Olave is widely regarded one of the best center backs in Major League Soccer, he was selected for the starting XI at the 2010 & 2011 MLS All-Star Games.  At 6-foot-3 and 220 pounds, his intimidating stature and strong play helped him secure Major League Soccer's Defender of the Year award in 2010.  He is known for his "combination of size, speed and strength". In five years with Real Salt Lake Olave appeared in 120 league matches and scored 10 goals and helped RSL capture the 2009 MLS Cup.

On December 3, 2012, Olave was traded with Fabián Espíndola to New York Red Bulls in exchange for allocation money. On March 3, 2013 Olave made his debut for New York scoring a goal for his new club in a 3-3 draw at Portland Timbers. In a match against Chicago Fire, he scored the opening goal in a 3-1 away loss. Olave played his first derby match against Red Bull rivals D.C. United, where he scored another goal in a 2-0 victory. Olave ended his first season with New York appearing in 29 league matches and scoring 4 goals, helping the club to its first major title the MLS Supporters' Shield.

On December 10, 2014 Olave was traded back to his former club Real Salt Lake in exchange for allocation money. He announced that he would once again leave the club on November 14, 2016.

Personal
Olave earned his U.S. green card in summer 2010. This status also qualified him as a domestic player for MLS roster purposes.

Coaching
On January 6, 2017 Olave was hired as a defensive coach for Real Monarchs under then head coach Mike Petke. He then served as an assistant coach for the Monarchs under Mark Briggs when Petke was named the head coach of Real Salt Lake. Olave served as interim head coach for the Monarchs before being named the permanent head coach on November 20, 2019.

Managerial statistics

References

External links

1981 births
Living people
Footballers from Medellín
Colombian footballers
Deportivo Cali footballers
Atlético Huila footballers
Patriotas Boyacá footballers
Boyacá Chicó F.C. footballers
Real Salt Lake players
New York Red Bulls players
Colombian expatriate footballers
Expatriate soccer players in the United States
Major League Soccer players
Major League Soccer All-Stars
Colombian expatriate sportspeople in the United States
Association football defenders
Real Monarchs coaches
USL Championship coaches
Colombian football managers
20th-century Colombian people
21st-century Colombian people